Agrias amydon, the Amydon agrias or white-spotted agrias, is a butterfly of the family Nymphalidae. It is found in Mexico, Central America, and South America.

The larvae feed on Erythroxylum species including E. havanense.

Subspecies
A. a. amydon (Colombia)
A. a. phalcidon (Brazil)
A. a. zenodorus (Ecuador, northern Peru)
A. a. amydonius (Peru (Loreto, Iquitos), Brazil (Amazonas), Colombia)
A. a. boliviensis (Bolivia (Yungas), Peru)
A. a. bogotana (western Venezuela to north-eastern Colombia)
A. a. frontina (north-western Ecuador (Rio Mira), western Colombia)
A. a. ferdinandi (Brazil (Mato Grosso, Minas Gerais, Goiás, Bahia, Pernambuco), Bolivia)
A. a. aurantiaca (Brazil (Pará, Amazonas), Surinam, south-western Venezuela)
A. a. aristoxenus (Peru, Bolivia)
A. a. excelsior (Brazil (Amazonas))
A. a. uniformis (Brazil (Roraima), southern Venezuela)
A. a. rubella (Brazil (Amazonas))
A. a. oaxacata (Mexico (Oaxaca))
A. a. smalli (Panama)
A. a. philatelica (Mexico (Chiapas), Costa Rica)
A. a. lacandona (Mexico)

There is also an undescribed subspecies from Venezuela.

Charaxinae
Fauna of Brazil
Nymphalidae of South America
Butterflies described in 1854
Butterflies of Central America
Butterflies of North America
Taxa named by William Chapman Hewitson